The Union of Workers in Industry, Garages, Construction Firms, Mines and Printers (STRIGECOMI) is a trade union in Rwanda. It is affiliated with the International Trade Union Confederation.

References

Trade unions in Rwanda
International Trade Union Confederation
General unions